Medina is an unincorporated community in Jefferson County, Kansas, United States.

History
Medina had its start in the year 1865 by the building of the railroad through that territory.

A post office in Medina opened in 1866 and closed in 1901.

References

Further reading

External links
 Jefferson County maps: Current, Historic, KDOT

Census-designated places in Jefferson County, Kansas
Census-designated places in Kansas